The Open de la Réunion is a tennis tournament nominally held in Réunion since 2011.

Past finals

Singles

Doubles

References

External links

ATP Challenger Tour
Hard court tennis tournaments
Sports competitions in Réunion
2011 in Réunion
Sport in Saint-Denis, Réunion